A special election was held in  on October 12, 1813 to fill a vacancy left by the resignation of John M. Hyneman (DR) on August 2, 1813

Election result

Udree took his seat on December 6, 1813

See also
List of special elections to the United States House of Representatives

References

Pennsylvania 1813 07
Pennsylvania 1813 07
1813 07
Pennsylvania 07
United States House of Representatives 07
United States House of Representatives 1813 07
October 1813 events